The Dancing Death (German: Der tanzende Tod) is a 1920 Austrian silent film directed by Jacob Fleck and Luise Fleck and starring Karl Ehmann, Liane Haid and Max Neufeld.

Cast
 Karl Ehmann as Graf Kürbach 
 Liane Haid
 Max Neufeld
 Alice Hetsey
 Hans Rhoden

References

Bibliography
 Parish, Robert. Film Actors Guide. Scarecrow Press, 1977.

External links

1920s German-language films
1920 films
Austrian silent feature films
Films directed by Jacob Fleck
Films directed by Luise Fleck
Austrian black-and-white films